Sergey Sergeyevich Mitrokhin (born 20 May 1963) is a Russian politician.

He is a former leader of the liberal Yabloko party. He was a member of the State Duma (1994–2003) and Moscow City Duma (2005–2009, 2019–). Mitrokhin studied at the Moscow State Pedagogical University and got his PhD in political science.

Electoral history 

|-
! colspan=2 style="background-color:#E9E9E9;text-align:left;vertical-align:top;" |Candidate
! style="background-color:#E9E9E9;text-align:left;vertical-align:top;" |Party
! style="background-color:#E9E9E9;text-align:right;" |Votes
! style="background-color:#E9E9E9;text-align:right;" |%
|-
|style="background-color: " |
|align=left|Oleg Leonov
|align=left|Independent
|57,505
|26.28%
|-
|style="background-color: " |
|align=left|Sergey Mitrokhin
|align=left|Yabloko
|47,815
|21.85%
|-
|style="background-color: " |
|align=left|Nina Ostanina
|align=left|Communist Party
|22,146
|10.12%
|-
|style="background-color: "|
|align=left|Maksim Shevchenko
|align=left|Russian Party of Freedom and Justice
|13,961
|6.38%
|-
|style="background-color: "|
|align=left|Andrey Shirokov
|align=left|Party of Pensioners
|13,935
|6.37%
|-
|style="background-color: "|
|align=left|Tatyana Vinnitskaya
|align=left|New People
|13,787
|6.30%
|-
|style="background-color: " |
|align=left|Magomet Yandiev
|align=left|A Just Russia — For Truth
|12,979
|5.93%
|-
|style="background-color: " |
|align=left|Dmitry Koshlakov-Krestovsky
|align=left|Liberal Democratic Party
|11,533
|5.28%
|-
|style="background-color: " |
|align=left|Dmitry Zakharov
|align=left|Communists of Russia
|7,411
|3.39%
|-
|style="background: ;"| 
|align=left|Ketevan Kharaidze
|align=left|Green Alternative
|5,745
|2.63%
|-
|style="background-color: " |
|align=left|Yakov Yakubovich
|align=left|Party of Growth
|4,219
|1.93%
|-
|style="background: ;"| 
|align=left|Anatoly Yushin
|align=left|Civic Platform
|2,307
|1.05%
|-
| colspan="5" style="background-color:#E9E9E9;"|
|- style="font-weight:bold"
| colspan="3" style="text-align:left;" | Total
| 218,839
| 100%
|-
| colspan="5" style="background-color:#E9E9E9;"|
|- style="font-weight:bold"
| colspan="4" |Source:
|
|}

References

1963 births
Living people
Yabloko politicians
Deputies of Moscow City Duma
Leaders of political parties
First convocation members of the State Duma (Russian Federation)
Second convocation members of the State Duma (Russian Federation)
Third convocation members of the State Duma (Russian Federation)

Russian activists against the 2022 Russian invasion of Ukraine